Jessica Ransom (born 1 December 1981) is a British actress and writer, best known for her role as medical receptionist Morwenna Newcross in the ITV drama Doc Martin (2011–2022). She won a Children's BAFTA Award in 2015.

Early life and education 
Ransom was born 1 December 1981 in Sheffield, England. She studied GCSE in Expressive Arts and A Level Theatre Studies at High Storrs School in Sheffield.

Career
After graduating from the University of Birmingham, Ransom did sketch writing and comedy. She appeared at the Edinburgh Festival Fringe with two pieces: "Million" and "Unsung Heroes." From 2009 to 2010, she appeared in various side characters in the sketch show The Armstrong and Miller Show. Thereafter, she appeared in the television improvisation show Fast and Loose in 2011 and that year also appeared as Morwenna Newcross, Doc Martin's medical receptionist (known for her mismatched colourful outfits) in the ITV drama Doc Martin, Ransom remaining a cast member playing that character to the present day.

In the meantime, Ransom performed in other productions. Ransom took the stage, including work in the 2012 revival of Posh. Also that year, Ransom appeared in the D.C Moore play, Straight, at the Sheffield Crucible and then at the Bush Theatre in London. In 2014, Ransom voiced the role of the titular character in the second season of Poppy Cat, replacing the original voice actress, Joanna Page. She appeared in a Sky TV advertisement with Bruce Willis where she was "totally unlimited" (the advertisement was banned in 2013 for being misleading, but has been re-released with more prominent information on the pricing) and appeared in series 4 of Horrible Histories and series 6, 7 and 8 of its 2015 revival winning the 2015 Children’s BAFTA Award for her role as Mary, Queen of Scots. Ransom was also a writer on The Amazing World of Gumball for seasons 3 to 6, and Elliott from Earth. Ransom also wrote an episode of Danger Mouse in 2017 called "Live and Let Cry."

Personal life 
Ransom lives in London. She is married to producer and director Ben Wilson and they have two sons.

Ransom has run the London Marathon four times, in 2012 for Mencap, in 2014 for Age UK and in 2015 and 2017 for Bloodwise.

Filmography

She also narrates Rich Kids Go Skint for 5Star.

References

External links
 
 

1981 births
Living people
Actresses from Sheffield
People educated at High Storrs School
21st-century British actresses
British stage actresses
British television actresses
21st-century English women
21st-century English people